The kingdom of Tushara, according to ancient Indian literature, such as the epic Mahabharata, was a land located beyond north-west India. In the Mahabharata, its inhabitants, known as the Tusharas, are depicted as mlechchas ("barbarians") and fierce warriors.

Modern scholars generally see Tushara as synonymous with the historical "Tukhara", also known as Tokhara or Tokharistan – another name for Bactria. This area was the stronghold of the Kushan Empire, which dominated India between the 1st and 3rd centuries CE.

Tukhara

The historical Tukhara appears to be synonymous with the land known by Ancient Chinese scholars as Daxia, from the 3rd century BCE onwards.

Its inhabitants were known later to Ancient Greek scholars as the Tokharoi and to the Ancient Romans as Tochari. Modern scholars appear to have conflated the  Tukhara with the so-called Tocharians – an Indo-European people who lived in the Tarim Basin, in present-day Xinjiang, China, until the 1st millennium. When the Tocharian languages of the Tarim were rediscovered in the early 20th century, most scholars accepted a hypothesis that they were linked to the Tukhara (who were known to have migrated to Central Asia from China, with the other founding Kushan peoples). However, the subjects of the Tarim kingdoms appear to have referred to themselves by names such as Agni, Kuči and Krorän. These peoples are also known to have spoken centum languages, whereas the Tukhara of Bactria spoke a satem language.

The Tukhara were among Indo-European tribes that conquered Central Asia during the 2nd century BCE, according to both Chinese and Greek sources. Ancient Chinese sources refer to these tribes collectively as the Da Yuezhi ("Greater Yuezhi"). In subsequent centuries the Tukhara and other tribes founded the Kushan Empire, which dominated Central and South Asia.

The account in Mahabharata (Mbh) 1:85 depicts the Tusharas as mlechchas ("barbarians") and descendants of Anu, one of the cursed sons of King Yayati. Yayati's eldest son Yadu, gave rise to the Yadavas and his youngest son Puru to the Pauravas that includes the Kurus and Panchalas. Only the fifth son of Puru's line was considered to be the successors of Yayati's throne, as he cursed the other four sons and denied them kingship. The Pauravas inherited the Yayati's original empire and stayed in the Gangetic plain who later created the Kuru and Panchala Kingdoms. They were followers of the Vedic culture. The Yadavas made central and western India their stronghold. The descendants of Anu, known as the Anavas, are said to have migrated to Iran.

Various regional terms and proper names may have originated with, or been derived from, the Tusharas including: Takhar Province in Afghanistan; the Pakistani village of Thakra; the surname Thakkar, found across India; the Marathi surname Thakere, sometimes anglicised as Thackeray; the Takhar Jat clan in Rajasthan, and the Thakar tribe of Maharashtra. It is also possible that the Thakor (or Thakore) caste of Gujarat, the Thakar caste of Maharashtra and the title Thakur originated with names such as Tushara/Tukhara. The Sanskrit word thakkura "administrator" may be the source of some such names or may itself be derived from one of them.

Indian literature

References in Mahabharata
The Shanti Parva of the Mahabharata associates the Tusharas with the  Yavanas, Kiratas, Chinas, Kambojas, Pahlavas, Kankas, Sabaras, Barbaras, Ramathas etc., and brands them all as barbaric tribes of Uttarapatha, leading lives of Dasyus.

The Tusharas along with numerous other tribes from the north-west, including the Bahlikas, Kiratas, Pahlavas, Paradas, Daradas, Kambojas, Shakas, Kankas, Romakas, Yavanas, Trigartas, Kshudrakas, Malavas, Angas, and Vangas had joined Yudhishtra at his Rajasuya ceremony and brought him numerous gifts such as camels, horses, cows, elephants and gold

Later the Tusharas, Sakas and Yavanas had joined the military division of the Kambojas and participated in the Mahabharata war on the side of the Kauravas. Karna Parva of Mahabharata describes the Tusharas as very ferocious and wrathful warriors.

At one place in the Mahabharata, the Tusharas are mentioned along with the Shakas and the Kankas. At another place they are in a list with the Shakas, Kankas and Pahlavas. And at other places are mentioned along with the Shakas, Yavanas and the Kambojas etc.

The Tushara kingdom is mentioned in the traves of Pandavas in the northern regions beyond the Himalayas:- Crossing the difficult Himalayan regions, and the countries of China, Tukhara, Darada and all the climes of Kulinda, rich in heaps of jewels, those warlike men reached the capital of Suvahu (3:176).

The Mahabharata makes clear that Vedic Hindus did not know the origins of the Mlechcha tribes, who were highly skilled in weapons, warfare and material sciences, but never followed the Vedic rites properly. That the Vedic people were dealing with foreign tribes is evident in a passage from Mahabharata (12:35). It asks which duties that should be performed by the Yavanas, the Kiratas, the Gandharvas, the Chinas, the Savaras, the Barbaras, the Sakas, the Tusharas, the Kankas, the Pathavas, the Andhras, the Madrakas, the Paundras, the Pulindas, the Ramathas, the Kambojas, and several new castes of Brahmanas, Kshatriyas, Vaishyas, and the Shudras, that had sprung up in the dominions of the Arya kings.

The kings of the Pahlavas and the Daradas and the various tribes of the Kiratas and Yavanas and Sakras and the Harahunas and Chinas and Tukharas and the Sindhavas and the Jagudas and the Ramathas and the Mundas and the inhabitants of the kingdom of women and the Tanganas and the Kekayas and the Malavas and the inhabitants of Kasmira, were present in the Rajasuya sacrifice of Yudhishthira the king of the Pandavas (3:51). The Sakas and Tukhatas and Tukharas and Kankas and Romakas and men with horns bringing with them as tribute numerous large elephants and ten thousand horses, and hundreds and hundreds of millions of golds (2:50).

The Tusharas were very ferocious warriors. The Yavanas and the Sakas, along with the Chulikas, stood in the right wing of the Kaurava battle-array (6:75). The Tusharas, the Yavanas, the Khasas, the Darvabhisaras, the Daradas, the Sakas, the Kamathas, the Ramathas, the Tanganas the Andhrakas, the Pulindas, the Kiratas of fierce prowess, the Mlecchas, the Mountaineers, and the races hailing from the sea-side, all endued with great wrath and great might, delighting in battle and armed with maces, these all—united with the Kurus and fought wrathfully for Duryodhana’s sake (8:73). A number of Saka and Tukhara and Yavana horsemen, accompanied by some of the foremost combatants among the Kambojas, quickly rushed against Arjuna (8:88).  F. E Pargiter writes that the Tusharas, along with the Yavanas, Shakas, Khasas and Daradas had collectively joined the Kamboja army of Sudakshina Kamboj and had fought in Kurukshetra war under latter's supreme command.

In the Puranas and other Indian texts
Puranic texts like Vayu Purana, Brahmanda Purana and Vamana Purana, etc., associate the Tusharas with the Shakas, Barbaras, Kambojas, Daradas, Viprendras, Anglaukas, Yavanas, Pahlavas etc and refer to them all as the tribes of Udichya i.e. north or north-west.  The Kambojas, Daradas, Barbaras, Harsavardhanas, Cinas and the Tusharas are described as the populous races of men outside.

Puranic literature further states that the Tusharas  and other tribes like the Gandharas, Shakas, Pahlavas, Kambojas, Paradas, Yavanas, Barbaras, Khasa, and Lampakas, etc., would be invaded and annihilated by Lord Kalki at the end of Kali Yuga. And they were annihilated by king Pramiti at the end of Kali Yuga.

According to Vayu Purana and Matsya Purana, river Chakshu (Oxus or Amu Darya) flowed through the countries of Tusharas, Lampakas, Pahlavas, Paradas and the Shakas, etc.

The Brihat-Katha-Manjari of Pt Kshemendra relates that around 400 CE, Gupta king Vikramaditya (Chandragupta II) (r. 375-413/15 CE), had "unburdened the sacred earth by destroying the barbarians" like the Tusharas, Shakas, Mlecchas, Kambojas, Yavanas, Parasikas, Hunas etc.

The Rajatarangini of Kalhana records that king Laliditya Muktapida, the 8th-century ruler of Kashmir had invaded the tribes of the north and after defeating the Kambojas, he immediately faced the Tusharas. The Tusharas did not give a fight but fled to the mountain ranges leaving their horses in the battlefield. This shows that during the 8th century CE, a section of the Tusharas was living as neighbours of the Kambojas near the Oxus valley.

By the 6th century CE, the Brihat Samhita of Varahamihira also locates the Tusharas with Barukachcha (Bhroach) and Barbaricum (on the Indus Delta) near the sea in western India. The Romakas formed a colony of the Romans near the port of Barbaricum in Sindhu Delta. This shows that a section of the Tusharas had also moved to western India and was living there around Vrahamihira's time.

There is also a mention of Tushara-Giri (Tushara mountain) in the Mahabharata, Harshacharita of Bana Bhata and Kavyamimansa of Rajshekhar. ÷

Kingdom

Historical references

Early Chinese & Greek sources
Little is known of the Tukhara before they conquered the Greco-Bactrian Kingdom in the 2nd century BCE. They are known, in subsequent centuries, to have spoken Bactrian, an Eastern Iranian language. The Yuezhi are generally believed to have had their ethnogenesis in Gansu, China. However, Ancient Chinese sources use the term Daxia (Tukhara) for a state in Central Asia, two centuries before the Yuezhi entered the area. Hence the Tukhara may have been recruited by the Yuezhi, from a people neighbouring or subject to the Greco-Bactrians.

Likewise the Atharvaveda also associates the Tusharas with the Bahlikas (Bactrians), Yavanas/Yonas (Greeks) and Sakas (Indo-Scythians), as following: "Saka.Yavana.Tushara.Bahlikashcha". It also places the Bahlikas as neighbors of the Kambojas. This may suggest suggests that the Tusharas were neighbours to these peoples, possibly in Transoxiana.

Later Chinese sources
In the 7th century CE, the Chinese pilgrim Xuanzang, by way of the "Iron Pass" entered Tukhara (覩貨羅 Pinyin Duhuoluo; W-G Tu-huo-luo). Xuanzang stated that it lay south of the Iron Pass, north of the "great snow mountains" (Hindukush), and east of Persia, with the Oxus "flowing westward through the middle of it."

During the time of Xuanzang, Tukhāra was divided into 27 administrative units, each having its separate chieftain.

Tibetan chronicles
The Tukharas (Tho-gar) are mentioned in the Tibetan chronicle Dpag-bsam-ljon-bzah (The Excellent Kalpa-Vrksa), along with people like the Yavanas, Kambojas, Daradas, Hunas, Khasas etc. Aurel Stein says that the Tukharas (Tokharoi/Tokarai) were a branch of the Yuezhi.  P. C. Bagchi holds that the Yuezhi, Tocharioi and Tushara were identical. If he is correct, the Rishikas, Tusharas/Tukharas (Tokharoi/Tokaroi), the Kushanas and the Yuezhi, were probably either a single people, or members of a confederacy.

Sabha Parva of Mahabharata states that the Parama Kambojas, Lohas and the Rishikas were allied tribes. Like the "Parama Kambojas", the Rishikas of the  Transoxian region are similarly styled as "Parama Rishikas". Based on the syntactical construction of the Mahabharata verse 5.5.15
and  verse 2.27.25,  Ishwa Mishra believe  that the Rishikas were a section of the Kambojas i.e. Parama Kambojas. V. S. Aggarwala too, relates the Parama Kambojas of the Trans-Pamirs to the Rishikas of the Mahabharata and also places them in the Sakadvipa (or Scythia).  According to Dr B. N. Puri and some other scholars, the Kambojas were a branch of the Tukharas. Based on the above Rishika-Kamboja connections, some scholars also claim that the Kambojas were a branch of the Yuezhi themselves. Dr Moti Chander also sees a close ethnic relationship between the Kambojas and the Yuezhi .

Modern scholars are still debating the details of these connections without coming to any firm consensus.

Japan Visit

According to the Nihon Shoki,  the second-oldest book of classical Japanese history, in 1654 two men and two women of the Tushara Kingdom, along with one woman from Shravasti, were drive by a storm to take refuge at the former Hyūga Province in southern Kyushu. They remained for several years before setting off for home. That is the first recorded visit of people from India to Japan.

See also
Tokharistan
Bactria
Tocharians
Kambojas
Bahlikas
Janapadas
Kingdoms of Ancient India
Mahabharata of Krishna Dwaipayana Vyasa, translated to English by Kisari Mohan Ganguli

Footnotes

External links

Kingdoms in the Mahabharata
Ancient history of Afghanistan